Elena Kosmina (born March 31, 1995) is a Ukrainian top model, beauty queen & beauty pageant titleholder who won the title of Top Model of the World 2015. She has modeled for commercial advertising campaigns and editorial photo shoots, known for her appearance in the international model pageant Top Model of the World 2015 and was crowned as Top Model of Ukraine.

Career
At the age of 13, she started attending model school and graduated in three years. At the age of 16, she started  participating in local beauty contests where was discovered by model agent from Elite Models Yana Stavitskay. In 2013, she was invited to the Black Sea Top Model contest where she became one of Top 10 best models. In August 2015, she was selected among 25 Ukrainian models as a Top Model of Ukraine by TMW and was sent as a model to represent her country on the international level.  On September 4, at Top Model of the World 2015 in El Gouna, Egypt,   she became a best model on the international level among top 50 most models all over the world.

References

External links
ELENA KOSMINA, EXÓTICA BELLEZA
Six Words: Elena Kosmina
Elena Kosmina para GQ México

1995 births
Living people
Ukrainian female models
Ukrainian people of Russian descent